Caumsett State Historic Park Preserve is a state park on Lloyd Neck, a peninsula extending into the Long Island Sound, in the Village of Lloyd Harbor, New York. It is operated by the New York State Office of Parks, Recreation and Historic Preservation.

The  park covers the former Marshall Field III estate that was developed in the 1920s, and was listed on the National Register of Historic Places in 1979. Much of the park is today managed as a nature preserve, with a focus on protecting high-quality bird habitat.

History

Marshall Field III bought the property in 1921 and had an estate house built in 1925, one of the largest estates of the Gold Coast mansions. Field named the property "Caumsett", after the Matinecock tribe's original name for the peninsula meaning "place by a sharp rock".

The  Marshall Field III estate was purchased by New York State for $4 million on February 3, 1961, and became a state park. The former estate was listed on the National Register of Historic Places in 1979.

In May 1961, plans were made to create Caumsett State Parkway, a northern extension of Bethpage State Parkway, to provide access to the park. Although right-of-way was acquired, the parkway was never built. A portion of this land was later used to create Cold Spring Harbor State Park and Trail View State Park.

Park description

The historic buildings within Caumsett State Historic Park Preserve are used for a variety of activities; former polo barns are used for equestrian education and services, while other buildings host environmental education programs and the Lloyd Harbor Historical Society.

Much of the remainder of the park is maintained as a nature preserve, with a focus on conservation of bird habitat. The remainder includes a variety of habitats, such as salt marsh and maritime beach. The designated area protects high-quality habitat that supports breeding populations of several species listed as threatened or endangered in New York State, including piping plovers, common terns, and least terns; many additional migratory species also make use of the protected landscape.

The park allows for recreation such as horse-riding, fishing, jogging, hiking, biking, and cross-country skiing. Scuba diving is also allowed by permit.

See also
 List of New York state parks
 List of New York State Historic Sites

References

External links
 
New York State Parks: Caumsett State Historic Park Preserve
NYS Department of Environmental Conservation: Caumsett Bird Conservation Area
Caumsett Foundation
Historic American Buildings Survey (HABS):

Houses on the National Register of Historic Places in New York (state)
New York (state) historic sites
Huntington, New York
State parks of New York (state)
Parks in Suffolk County, New York
Houses in Suffolk County, New York
National Register of Historic Places in Suffolk County, New York